Montebello is a monotypic genus of Australian ground spiders containing the single species, Montebello tenuis. It was first described by Henry Roughton Hogg in 1914, who separated the single species from the Liocranidae. It has only been found in Australia.

References

Gnaphosidae
Spiders described in 1914
Spiders of Australia